This is a list of the National Register of Historic Places listings in Shackelford County, Texas.

This is intended to be a complete list of properties and districts listed on the National Register of Historic Places in Shackelford County, Texas. There are one district and four individual properties listed on the National Register in the county. The district includes one State Antiquities Landmark and several Recorded Texas Historic Landmarks. Two other properties are also State Antiquities Landmarks including one Texas State Historic Site.

Current listings

The locations of National Register properties and districts may be seen in a mapping service provided.

|}

See also

National Register of Historic Places listings in Texas
Recorded Texas Historic Landmarks in Shackelford County

References

External links

Shackelford County, Texas
Shackelford County
Buildings and structures in Shackelford County, Texas